Joseph Schuster may refer to:

Joseph Schuster (cellist) (1903–1969), Constantinople-born American cellist
Joseph Schuster (composer) (1748–1812), German classical composer
Joe Shuster (1914–1992), Canadian-born comic book writer who created Superman
Josef Schuster (born 1954), German physician and President of the Central Council of Jews in Germany
Joseph Schuster (vaudeville) (1896–1959), American composer, music publisher, and vaudeville and radio performer